Stracciatella di bufala is a cheese produced from Italian buffalo milk in the province of Foggia, located in the southern Italian region of Apulia, using a stretching (pasta filata) and a shredding technique.

Description

Stracciatella cheese is composed of small shreds—hence its name, which in Italian is a diminutive of straccia ("rag" or "shred") meaning "a little shred".
It is a stretched curd fresh cheese, white in colour, and made the whole year round, but is thought to be at its best during the spring and summer months.
This stracciatella is unusual in that buffalo herds and the cheeses made from their milk are much more common over on the western side of the Apennines in Lazio and Campania.

When mixed with thick cream, stracciatella is also used to make burrata (Italian for "buttered"): this is a rich, buttery textured cheese which comes enclosed in a bag of mozzarella and is thought to have been originally created in the early 20th century in Andria on the Murgia plateau. It is also now made outside Italy, especially in the United States and Argentina. Since neither stracciatella nor burrata keeps well even when refrigerated, these cheeses need to be consumed promptly, while they are still soft and fresh.

See also
 Burrata
 List of stretch-curd cheeses
 List of water buffalo cheeses
 Mozzarella

References

Italian cheeses
Water buffalo's-milk cheeses
Cuisine of Apulia
Stretched-curd cheeses